William Andrew Coulthard Robinson (born 14 March 1957) is a British author and former newspaper editor.

Andrew Robinson was educated at the Dragon School, Eton College, where he was a King's Scholar, University College, Oxford, where he read chemistry, and finally the School of Oriental and African Studies in London. He is the son of Neville Robinson, an Oxford physicist, and Daphne Robinson.

Robinson first visited India in 1975, and has been involved with the country's culture ever since. He has authored many books and articles, the most recent being India: A Short History (Thames & Hudson, 2014). Until 2006, he was the literary editor of the Times Higher Education Supplement. He has also been a visiting fellow at Wolfson College, Cambridge. He is based in London and is now a full-time writer.

Bibliography

Books
Robinson has authored and edited the following books:

 
 Maharaja: The Spectacular Heritage of Princely India with Sumio Uchiyama. Thames & Hudson (1988). .
 Satyajit Ray: The Inner Eye. André Deutsch (1989). .
 The Art of Rabindranath Tagore. André Deutsch (1989). .
 The Shape of the World with Simon Berthon. George Philip (1991). .
 Earth Shock: Hurricanes, Volcanoes, Earthquakes, Tornadoes & Other Forces of Nature. Thames & Hudson (1993). .
 Rabindranath Tagore: The Myriad-minded Man with Krishna Dutta. St. Martin's Press (1995). . Also: Bloomsbury (1997). .
 Rabindranath Tagore: An Anthology with Krishna Dutta. St. Martin's Press (1997). . Also: Griffin (1998). .
 Selected Letters of Rabindranath Tagore with Krishna Dutta. Cambridge University Press (1997). .
 The Story of Writing: Alphabets, Hieroglyphs and Pictograms. Thames & Hudson (2000). .
 The Man Who Deciphered Linear B: The Story of Michael Ventris. Thames & Hudson (2002). .
 Lost Languages: The Enigma of the World's Great Undeciphered Scripts. McGraw-Hill (2002). .
 Satyajit Ray, The Inner Eye: The Biography of a Master Film-Maker. I.B. Tauris (2003). .
 Satyajit Ray: A Vision of Cinema with Nemai Ghosh. I.B. Tauris (2005). .
 Einstein: A Hundred Years of Relativity. Palazzo Editions (2005). .
 The Last Man Who Knew Everything: Thomas Young, The Anonymous Polymath Who Proved Newton Wrong, Explained How We See, Cured the Sick, and Deciphered the Rosetta Stone, Among Other Feats of Genius. Pi Press (2006). .
 The Story of Measurement. Thames & Hudson (2007). .
 Writing and Script: A Very Short Introduction. Oxford University Press (2009). .
 Genius: A Very Short Introduction. Oxford University Press (2011). .
 Cracking the Egyptian Code: The Revolutionary Life of Jean-Francois Champollion. Thames & Hudson (2012). . Oxford University Press (2012). .
 The Scientists: An Epic of Discovery (editor). Thames & Hudson (2012). .
 India: A Short History. Thames & Hudson (2014). .
 The Indus: Lost Civilizations. Reaktion Books (2015). .
 Earth-Shattering Events: Earthquakes, Nations and Civilization. Thames & Hudson (2016). .
 Einstein on the Run: How Britain Saved the World's Greatest Scientist. Yale University Press (2019). .

Book reviews

References

External links

 Andrew Robinson – Official website
 Selected Books by Andrew Robinson

1957 births
Living people
People educated at The Dragon School
People educated at Eton College
Alumni of University College, Oxford
Alumni of SOAS University of London
British biographers
British male journalists
British newspaper editors
British non-fiction writers
Fellows of Wolfson College, Cambridge
History Today people
Writers from London
Male biographers